Kenan is an American television sitcom created by Jackie Clarke and David Caspe. The series stars Kenan Thompson as Kenan Williams, the widowed father of Aubrey (Dani Lane) and Birdie (Dannah Lane) who hosts a morning show in Atlanta, Georgia. The show follows Williams' attempts to move on from his previous life, though he is met with much resistance from his former father-in-law Rick (Don Johnson) and brother Gary (Chris Redd). He also becomes close friends with Mika (Kimrie Lewis), his show's executive producer. The series premiered on NBC on February 16, 2021. In April 2021, the series was renewed for a second season. The second season premiered on December 15, 2021, ahead of the second season time slot premiere on January 3, 2022. In May 2022, the series was canceled after two seasons.

For his work on the show, Thompson received a nomination for the Primetime Emmy Award for Outstanding Lead Actor in a Comedy Series in 2021.

Premise 
The series follows Kenan Williams (Kenan Thompson), a widowed father of two daughters, Aubrey (Dani Lane) and Birdie (Dannah Lane), living in Atlanta, Georgia. Kenan works as a host for a morning program, executive-produced by Mika (Kimrie Lewis). He lives with his father-in-law Rick (Don Johnson) and brother Gary (Chris Redd), both of whom offer their own differing perspectives on life and family.

Cast

Main 
 Kenan Thompson as Kenan Williams
 Don Johnson as Rick Noble
 Chris Redd as Gary Williams
 Kimrie Lewis as Mika Caldwell
 Dani Lane as Aubrey Williams
 Dannah Lane as Birdie Williams
 Taylor Louderman as Tami Greenlake (season 2, recurring season 1)

Recurring 
 Niccole Thurman as Cori Williams
 Jeff Lewis as Phil
 Willow Beuoy as Zoe
 Fortune Feimster as Pam Fox, sports commentator for Kenan's show
 Vanessa Bell Calloway as Bobbi, Kenan and Gary's widowed mother

Episodes

Series overview

Season 1 (2021)

Season 2 (2021–22)

Production

Development 
Co-creator Jackie Clarke, previously the head writer for Superstore, had written three separate versions starring Kenan Thompson. First, the show was planned to air as Saving Larry. The title (and title character's name) was later changed to Saving Kenan. The third attempt, titled The Kenan Show, was planned to air in May 2019. Chris Rock joined as the pilot's director and executive producer in January 2019. However, the pilot never aired and the project was put on hold for re-tooling. Rock has dropped out of the project and the director for Kenan's pilot episode was Ken Whittingham. In July 2020, David Caspe, creator of comedies such as Happy Endings and Black Monday, was brought in to develop and re-write the newest re-tooled pilot with Clarke and serve as showrunner-executive producer on the first season.

On January 26, 2021, the new title and its new cast was announced virtually at the TCA panel, as part of the 2021 Winter Press Tour for NBC. At the panel, Thompson stated "It was a long process, starting with finding someone to settle on the idea with. Jackie and I had a similar idea for what kind of show people hadn’t seen before — how to put a new twist on the ‘uplifting father figure’ kind of show."

On April 30, 2021, the series was renewed for a second season. More recently, Kenny Smith, formerly of Black-ish joined the show as co-showrunner. On May 12, 2022, the series was canceled after two seasons.

Casting 

The show is led by Kenan Thompson, actor, and comedian best known for his work on Saturday Night Live. In an interview with Entertainment Weekly, Thompson said that, "It's every comedian's dream to get their own show on a major network, especially one of the original three. It's historic, mind-blowing and very surreal." Thompson originally made a deal with Universal Television in late 2018, with plans for his show to air on NBC the following year. Though he is starring in Kenan, Thompson told Variety that he has no plans to leave Saturday Night Live, as some had rumored.

Sisters Dani and Dannah Lane were cast as Aubrey and Birdie Williams after being seen in the "Call Jesus" viral music video alongside DJ Suede the Remix God, that was published March 7, 2018. Andy García was originally cast in the role of Percy, Kenan's father-in-law. However, García dropped out of the project in 2019 and the role was given to Don Johnson. The character's name was also changed to Rick. The role of Mika, Kenan's executive producer, was originally named Erica and was originally given to actress Punam Patel. However, Patel dropped out of the project with García and the role was given to Kimrie Lewis. Fellow SNL star, Chris Redd, was also cast to play Gary Williams, Kenan's brother.

Broadcast 
The series premiered on February 16, 2021. A holiday special episode titled as "Christmas" aired on December 15, 2021 as the season premiere, ahead of the second season moving to its time slot on January 3, 2022.

Reception

Critical response
On Rotten Tomatoes, the series has an approval rating of 67% based on 12 critic reviews, with an average rating of 7.62/10. The website's critical consensus reads, "Kenan benefits from the warmth of its winsome ensemble—led by a reliably solid Kenan Thompson—but its stale sitcom trappings leave something to be desired." On Metacritic, it has a weighted average score of 63 out of 100, based on eight critic reviews, indicating "generally favorable reviews".

Ratings

Season 1

Season 2

Notes

References

External links

2020s American workplace comedy television series
2020s American black sitcoms
2021 American television series debuts
2022 American television series endings
English-language television shows
NBC original programming
Television series about families
Television series about television
Television series about widowhood
Television series by Broadway Video
Television series by Universal Television
Television shows set in Atlanta